Kimia or Kimiya is a Persian feminine given name. It may also refer to:

Kimia (given name)
Kimia Khatoon, Persian language novel by Saideh Ghods
Kimia Farma, Indonesian pharmaceutical producer and distributor
Kimia Aqqala F.C., or Shohadaye Aqqala F.C., Iranian football club
 Kimia (fly), a genus of flies in the family Culicidae

See also
Kimiya (Japanese given name)